Cankuzo Province is one of the 18 provinces of Burundi. Located in the eastern part of the country, the province covers an area of 1,965 km. The provincial capital is Cankuzo. It is Burundi's least populated province.

Communes

Cankuzo Province is divided into five communes; each governed by an elected 25-member council.

Commune of Cankuzo
Commune of Cendajuru
Commune of Gisagara
Commune of Kigamba
Commune of Mishiha

Politics
Direct Communal and National Assembly elections were held throughout Burundi on 3 June and 4 July 2005, respectively.

In communal council elections, the National Council for the Defense of Democracy-Forces for the Defense of Democracy (CNDD- FDD) won a majority of the 125 seats followed by the Front for Democracy in Burundi (FRODEBU) and Union for National Progress (UPRONA). Smaller parties won the remaining seats.
Cankuzo province has four deputies in the National Assembly. They are distributed as follows: CNDD-FDD – 2, FRODEBU – 1, UPRONA – 1.

References

 
Provinces of Burundi